The Hurlingham Club is an exclusive private social and athletic club located in the Fulham area of London, England. It is a member of the Association of London Clubs.

History

Early history

The Gun Club was formed in 1860 at the Hornsey Wood Tavern, which stood in what today is Finsbury Park in Harringay, London. The creation of the park in 1867 forced a relocation and Frank Heathcote received the permission of Richard Naylor to promote live pigeon shooting at his Hurlingham estate. His next step was the formation of the Hurlingham Club for this purpose and "as an agreeable country resort". The club leased the estate from Naylor in 1869 and in 1874 acquired the land outright for £27,500. The pigeon today forms part of the club's crest. Until 1905, clouds of pigeons were released in the summer from an enclosure near what is now a tennis pavilion.

The Prince of Wales (later King Edward VII), an early patron, was a keen shot and his presence ensured the club's status and notability from the beginning. The club's most recent patron was Prince Philip, Duke of Edinburgh.

Polo

In 1873, the club published the rules of polo, which are still followed by most of the world to this day. Polo was first played at the club on 6 June 1874. On 18 July 1878, the club along with Ranelagh became the first to play a sports match under floodlights. In 1886, the club hosted the first international polo match between England and the United States. The polo matches for the 1908 Summer Olympics were played at Hurlingham. Three teams entered: Hurlingham, Roehampton Club, and a combined British and Irish team. Roehampton won.

The Westchester Cup was played at the club in 1900, 1902, 1909, 1921 and 1936. Before the Second World War, Hurlingham was the headquarters of British polo. The governing body of British polo is called the Hurlingham Polo Association. However polo is no longer staged at Hurlingham after the size of the club was significantly reduced after the war when the polo fields were compulsorily purchased by the Metropolitan Borough of Fulham to build council housing (the Sulivan Court estate). The Guards Polo Club in Windsor Great Park has succeeded to the status of the leading British polo club.

Golf
There is a nine-hole par 3 golf course that is open in winter months.

Croquet
Hurlingham has been at the centre of world croquet for many years.  The Croquet Association had its headquarters in the club from 1959 to 2002. Top-ranking international competitions are regularly held on the lawns, at one time the finest in the country, though the CA headquarters have since relocated to the Cheltenham Croquet Club.

Other sports and events
Other sports include lawn tennis, cricket, bowls, skittles, squash and swimming (with both indoor and outdoor pools) as well as fitness facilities and a gymnasium. Games such as bridge, backgammon and chess are popular indoor pursuits. The club has also hosted the Grand Prix Ball and the Concours d'Elegance.

Membership
Members must be proposed and seconded by two current full members of the club. Since 2018, the waitlist for becoming a member has been closed, but children and spouses of current members are given preference when vacancies do arise.

The club currently has around 13,000 members – of whom around 6,000 have full voting rights.

Notable members
Lord Fowler, Lord Temple-Morris, Adam Raphael, novelist and peer Jeffrey Archer, the actor Trevor Eve and his wife Sharon Maughan are all members of the Hurlingham Club. Past members include Walter Buckmaster, the Carry On actress Liz Fraser and Air Vice-Marshal Sir William Cushion.

In 2011, Charles Nall-Cain, 3rd Baron Brocket was refused membership owing to his stint in prison.

Gallery

See also
 List of London's gentlemen's clubs

Bibliography
 The Hurlingham Club, 1869–1953, by Henry Taprell Dorling (1953)
 Pigeons, Polo, and Other Pastimes: A History of the Hurlingham Club, by Nigel Miskin (2000)

References

External links

 

1869 establishments in England
History of the London Borough of Hammersmith and Fulham
Venues of the 1908 Summer Olympics
Gentlemen's clubs in London
Fulham
Olympic polo venues
Polo clubs in the United Kingdom
Sport in Hammersmith and Fulham
Sports clubs established in 1869
Tennis venues in London